Pierre Jeannin (1542–1623) was a French statesman, otherwise known as a surintendant des finances (Finance Superintendent). In 1573 he married Anne Gueniot and had one daughter, Charlotte Jeannin.

Career 
He was born at Autun.  A pupil of the great jurist Jacques Cujas at Bourges, he was an advocate at Dijon by 1569 and became councillor and then president of the parlement of Burgundy. He unsuccessfully opposed the massacre of St Bartholomew in his province. As councillor to Charles of Lorraine, Duke of Mayenne, he sought to reconcile him with King Henry IV of France.

After the victory of Fontaine-Française (1595), Henry took Jeannin into his council and in 1602 named him intendant of finances. He took part in the principal events of the reign, negotiated the Treaty of Lyon with Charles Emmanuel I, Duke of Savoy, and the defensive alliance between France and the United Netherlands in 1608. As Superintendent of Finances under King Louis XIII, be tried to establish harmony between the king and the queen mother, Marie de' Medici.

References

Berger de Xivrey, Lettres missives de Henri IV. (in the Collection inédité pour l'histoire de France), t. v. (1850)
Pierre Saumaise, Eloge sur la vie de Pierre Janin (Dijon, 1623)
Sainte-Beuve, Causeries du lundi, t. x. (May 1854)

1542 births
1623 deaths
People from Autun
French diplomats
French Ministers of Finance